A subdistrict or sub-district is an administrative division that is generally smaller than a district.

Equivalents 

 Administrative posts of East Timor, formerly Portuguese-language 
 Kelurahan, in Indonesia
 Mukim, a township in Brunei, Indonesia, Malaysia, and Singapore
 Nahiyah, in Palestine and Syria
 Tambon, a township in Thailand
 Tehsil (also known as tahsil, taluka, taluk, circle, mandal or subdivision), a township in South Asia
 Upazila, in  Bangladesh

Translations 
 Subdistricts of China, in Mainland China, literally streets and avenues

References

Types of administrative division